Medway High School is a high school in Arva in Middlesex County, Ontario, Canada, approximately one kilometre north of London, Ontario, Canada city limits.

History
Medway was built in 1949. Its original name was East Middlesex High School, but it was known locally as the Arva School. The name was changed to Medway to reflect the Medway Creek which winds through the area.

Medway was part of the Middlesex County Board of Education. Today it is part of the Thames Valley District School Board, which is Ontario's third largest board.

Music Program
In 1996, Ken Fleet conducted London Pro Musica, the Medway Senior Concert Choir, and the Medway Girls Choir in recording seventy-two songs for Nancy Telfer’s Choral Audio Library. The five CDs have been played on national radio in Italy, Israel, Australia, and Argentina and used extensively at major national and international music conferences.

The Medway Choir also won the Canadian Broadcasting Corporation choral competition for the best youth choir in Canada in 1980.

Chess Team

In the 2009–2010 school year, Medway High School's chess team became the first to win all five local tournaments held in Thames Valley District School Board. In the nearly 20-year history of these tournaments, this feat has never before been accomplished. The same chess team was the first to win every game played (20-0-0) in a single tournament.

Sports
 Varsity Baseball
 Jr Football
 Sr Football
 Field Hockey
 Jr Girls Basketball
 Sr Girls Basketball
 Jr Boys Volleyball
 Sr Boys Volleyball
 Cross Country
 Golf
 Girls Hockey
 Boys Hockey
 Sr Girls Volleyball
 Jr Girls Volleyball
 Sr Boys Basketball
 Jr Boys Basketball
 Swimming
 Badminton
 Curling
 Boys Rugby
 Girls Rugby
 Track and Field
 Boys Soccer
 Girls Soccer
 Archery
 Special Olympics
 Chess
 Wrestling

Notable alumni

 Garth Hudson – Rock and Roll Hall of Fame inductee for the Canadian-American rock group The Band
 Scott Moir – Figure skater, three-time World champion and three-time Olympic gold medalist in ice dancing
 Matt Read – NHL hockey player, Philadelphia Flyers
 Kimberly Tuck – curler
 Mike Tompkins – YouTube personality
Jacob Ruby – CFL football player, Edmonton Eskimos
Jonny Gray – Actor
Greg Brady - Radio/TV Broadcaster, Host on CJCL , CFIQ, & BBC Radio

See also
List of high schools in Ontario

References

External links
 Medway High School

High schools in Middlesex County, Ontario
Educational institutions established in 1949
1949 establishments in Ontario